O Jibon Re (Assamese: ও জীৱন ৰে) is a 2014 Indian Goalparia language (one shot) video film, written and directed by Robin Chandra Roy. Under banner of R C R Production.

Cast
 J P Mazumder
 Moinul Hoque
 Azibur Rahman
 Mehbub Hasan
 Prodip Roy

References

External links

2014 short films
2014 films
Indian short films
Films set in Assam